Øysand is a small village in the northwestern part of the municipality of Melhus in Trøndelag county, Norway.  The village sits on the south side of the mouth of the Gaula River, at the head of the Gaulosen, an arm off the main Trondheim Fjord.

Geography

The Gaula River borders Øysand to the north and east, separating it from Leinstrand in the municipality of Trondheim. To the west there is a shallow sandy beach on the shore of Gaulosen, a branch of Trondheim Fjord. To the south, the section of European route E39 from Klett to Orkanger crosses the area. Øysand is a flat plain and most of the land is used for growing grain. There is also some industry there and a campground along the beach. The best-known native of the area is the musician, composer, and actor Ivar Gafseth, who is known from the television series The Julekalender and the Trøndelag Theater.

Name
The name of the area was originally simply Øy 'island'. The name Øysand is also found spelled as Øysandan and Øysanden, but these forms are hardly ever used in speech. The dative form of Øysand in the local dialect is på Øysaɲɲa. In 2012, the Norwegian Mapping and Cadastre Authority sought to standardize the spelling as Øysand.

Nordstern
During the Second World War, the Germans developed plans to create a new German metropolis in Øysand called Nordstern.

References

Beaches of Norway
Melhus
Landforms of Trøndelag
Villages in Trøndelag